is a passenger railway station located in the city of Himeji, Hyōgo Prefecture, Japan, operated by West Japan Railway Company (JR West).

Lines

Station layout
The station consists of two ground-level opposed side platforms connected by a footbridge. One of the side platforms was originally an island platform, but the tracks on one side are no longer used. The station is unattended.

Platforms

Adjacent stations

|-
!colspan=5|West Japan Railway Company

History
Kōro Station opened on July 26, 1894.  With the privatization of the Japan National Railways (JNR) on April 1, 1987, the station came under the aegis of the West Japan Railway Company.

Passenger statistics
In fiscal 2016, the station was used by an average of 1557 passengers daily.

Surrounding area
Himeji City Hall Kodera Office
Himeji Municipal Library Koji Annex
Kodera Museum of History
Japan Toy Museum

See also
List of railway stations in Japan

References

External links

  

Railway stations in Himeji
Bantan Line
Railway stations in Japan opened in 1894